John Kelman (born 30 September 1968) is a Barbadian boxer. He competed in the men's featherweight event at the 1996 Summer Olympics. After the referee stopped his opening bout against János Nagy of Hungary, Kelman angrily threw one of his gloves and was subsequently banned from amateur boxing for one year. Kelman also represented Barbados at the 1998 Commonwealth Games.

References

External links
 

1968 births
Living people
Barbadian male boxers
Olympic boxers of Barbados
Boxers at the 1996 Summer Olympics
Commonwealth Games competitors for Barbados
Boxers at the 1998 Commonwealth Games
Place of birth missing (living people)
Featherweight boxers